"Love Is Lost" is a song by English rock musician David Bowie from his album The Next Day. James Murphy's "Hello Steve Reich Mix for the DFA" was released as the fifth single from Bowie's 24th studio album The Next Day as a promotion for The Next Day Extra, a special edition of bonus tracks, remixes, and music videos. The remix version of the song contains cut and looped samples from a new recording of Steve Reich's 1972 piece Clapping Music performed by Murphy and three other musicians, plus a sample from Bowie's 1980 hit "Ashes to Ashes."

Release details
The single release is an edited version of the remix by James Murphy of LCD Soundsystem.

Bowie debuted the video at the Mercury Prize ceremony on 30 October 2013, where The Next Day was on the list for Album of the Year.

A 12" limited edition white vinyl version of single was released on 16 December, which included the remix by James Murphy and the Venetian Mix of "I'd Rather Be High" (also from The Next Day), a song that was also featured in Louis Vuitton's high-profile "Voyage" campaign, which included Bowie himself in a leading role.

"I'd Rather Be High" received a new anti-war video from Bowie in November and was added to the playlists of UK's Absolute Radio, BBC Radio 6 and BBC Radio 2 in December 2013.

Music videos

Assisted by photographer Jimmy King and long-time personal assistant Corinne "Coco" Schwab, Bowie wrote, shot, and edited the music video himself for a cost of US$12.99, the cost of the flash drive he had to buy to save the video on his camera. The entire video was recorded by Bowie in his Manhattan apartment during the weekend prior to its Internet release. The wooden puppets of Pierrot and The Thin White Duke were produced by Jim Henson's Creature Shop for an unfinished and unreleased music video for "The Pretty Things Are Going to Hell". The price of these puppets was not included in the video budget.

Barnaby Roper directed the video for the 10-minute remix. It contains polygons and wireframes that eventually form into a nude couple embracing.

Track listing
 ISO/Columbia — 44–102199

Personnel
According to Chris O'Leary:

David Bowie – lead and backing vocal, organ, keyboards
Gail Ann Dorsey – bass guitar
Gerry Leonard – guitar
Zachary Alford – drums
James Murphy, Matthew Thornley, Hisham Bharoocha and Jordan Hebert – "clapping chorus" (remix versions)

Technical
David Bowie – producer
Tony Visconti – producer, engineer
Mario J. McNulty – engineer
James Murphy – producer, engineer (remix)

Release history

References

Sources

2013 singles
2013 songs
Columbia Records singles
David Bowie songs
Songs written by David Bowie
Song recordings produced by Tony Visconti
Gothic rock songs
British psychedelic rock songs
Music videos directed by David Bowie